Everthorpe is a hamlet in the East Riding of Yorkshire, England. Everthorpe forms part of the civil parish of North Cave.

In 1823 Everthorpe was in the parish of North Cave and in the Wapentake of Harthill. Population was 177, which included Drewton, a hamlet less than 1 mile to the north-east. Occupations included three farmers, a corn miller, and the landlord of Duke of York public house.

The area was home to two prisons - HMP Everthorpe and HMP Wolds - in 2014 merged into one: HM Prison Humber.

References

Villages in the East Riding of Yorkshire